Allan Schofield (born January 26, 1957) is a former Indian hockey player. He was part of the Indian hockey team that won the gold medal in 1980 Summer Olympics at Moscow.

He completed his schooling from St. Cathedral High School in Bangalore and joined the Indian Navy. In 1975, he was invited to join the Services National team after he accidentally kept the goal for an inter-club football game and excelled at it. A few months later, he was again called to be the custodian for a hockey match and within a year, he was in the National Hockey team of 1976.

A part of the star-studded squad that lost the 1978 Bangkok Asian Games final to arch-rivals Pakistan, Schofield entered the hall of fame two years later when the national team captured their eighth Olympic gold medal at the Moscow Games. He was the second goalkeeper in the team, with Bir Bahadur Chettri being the main custodian. He is an MBA graduate and settled in Canada in his later years.

References

External links
 

1957 births
Living people
Olympic field hockey players of India
Olympic gold medalists for India
Field hockey players at the 1980 Summer Olympics
Anglo-Indian people
Olympic medalists in field hockey
Indian male field hockey players
Medalists at the 1980 Summer Olympics
Asian Games medalists in field hockey
Field hockey players at the 1978 Asian Games
Asian Games silver medalists for India
Medalists at the 1978 Asian Games